Ian Wishart may refer to:

 Ian Wishart (cricketer)  (born 1948), former English cricketer
 Ian Wishart (journalist) (born 1964), New Zealand journalist
 Ian Wishart (politician) (born c. 1954), Canadian politician